Paul Carige (born 5 August 1973) is an Australian former rugby league footballer who played in the 1990s. He played for the Illawarra Steelers, Parramatta Eels, and the Salford City Reds. He mostly played at centre, but occasionally he played the odd game at fullback or wing.

Playing career
Carige made his first-grade début for the Illawarra Steelers in round 2 of the 1996 season, an 18–10 loss to the Auckland Warriors at Ericsson Stadium. He played 16 games and scored one try in his début season.

In 1997, Carige joined the Parramatta Eels. The 1997 season also saw the recruitment of a new coach, former Illawarra Steelers and St. George Dragons mentor Brian Smith. Smith's appointment saw a reversal in the club's fortunes, taking the Parramatta club from being perennial easybeats (not having made a finals appearance since their last premiership win in 1986) to title contenders, although the club lost both of their finals matches that year to the Newcastle Knights and the North Sydney Bears in weeks 1 and 2 of the finals series respectively. In 1998, the Parramatta side went even closer to breaking their premiership drought, going within one game of making their first Grand Final appearance since 1986.

Carige is probably best remembered for his poor performance in Parramatta's 32–20 extra-time loss to arch-rivals the Bulldogs in the 1998 preliminary final at the Sydney Football Stadium. With just 11 minutes remaining, Parramatta had a commanding 18–2 lead, and looked like inevitable victors, but three quick tries to Craig Polla-Mounter, Rod Silva and Willie Talau saw the Bulldogs side draw level at 18-all. With only seconds remaining in regular time, Carige inexplicably kicked the ball on the first tackle from deep within his own half straight to Bulldogs' five-eighth Craig Polla-Mounter. Polla-Mounter immediately made an attempt at kicking a field goal and almost stole the match in regular time, with the ball only narrowly missing by passing under the crossbar. In extra-time, Carige then caught a ball from a kick return, once again deep in his own territory, only to inadvertently run over the sideline, further hampering his side’s chances. The Bulldogs went on to win the match 32–20, and would subsequently qualify for the 1998 NRL Grand Final against the Brisbane Broncos the following week. Despite being contracted with the Parramatta club until the end of the 1999 season, Carige's stint with the club ended after this match. In his two seasons with the Eels, he had played 45 games and scored 13 tries, but after the preliminary final loss, Carige was forced to flee Sydney for Coffs Harbour after receiving abuse from people wherever he went and further bullying from disgruntled fans over the internet.

In 1999, Carige joined an English Super League side, the Salford City Reds. After playing 27 games and scoring seven tries for the Reds, Carige left Salford at the end of the 1999 Super League season.

In 2000, Carige played for the Newtown Jets in the NSW Cup competition.
Carige then returned to Queensland, where he went on to play for the Wynnum-Manly Seagulls in the Queensland Cup and then captain/coached the Fassifern Bombers in the Ipswich local competition in 2005.

In November 2018, Carige unexpectedly made a comeback after several years in hiding, taking to the field for Parramatta in the Legends of League tournament.

References

1973 births
Living people
Australian rugby league players
Illawarra Steelers players
Parramatta Eels players
Salford Red Devils players
Rugby league fullbacks
Rugby league wingers
Rugby league centres
Toowoomba Clydesdales players
Wynnum Manly Seagulls players
Place of birth missing (living people)